The Circle Line (CCL) is a medium-capacity Mass Rapid Transit line in Singapore operated by SMRT Corporation. It runs in a currently incomplete loop from Dhoby Ghaut station in the city area of Singapore to HarbourFront station in the south via Bishan station in Central Singapore. It also has a branch to Marina Bay station from Promenade station, which will be extended to Harbourfront station from 2026 to form a complete loop. Travelling from one end of the line to the other takes about an hour.

The line is the fourth MRT line to be opened, with the first stage (from Bartley to Marymount stations) commencing operations on 28 May 2009 after delays due to the Nicoll Highway collapse. The next stage to Dhoby Ghaut station was completed on 17 April 2010 and the next stage to Harbourfront opened on 8 October 2011. A two-station extension to Marina Bay station was opened on 14 January 2012. The last stage of the line from Harbourfront to Marina Bay will be completed in 2026, completing the loop.

It is the second line in Singapore to be completely automated and driverless and is among the world's longest driverless rapid transit lines. It is also the first medium capacity line in Singapore, with each Circle Line train, the C830 and C830C, having a three-car configuration.

History

Original plans

The Circle Line dates back to 1989, when then Minister for Communications and Information, Yeo Ning Hong stated that such a system would be "feasible when the population reaches four million", noting the slow population growth and demand.

Feasibility studies for the proposed line commenced on 11 October 1994. The line, then named the Marina Line, was first announced on 16 October 1997. The line would serve Marina Centre and the new downtown at Marina South, with multiple branches to Chinatown and Dhoby Ghaut via the National Stadium to either Kallang or Paya Lebar stations. The line was planned to have 18 stations, with a possible extension to Tanjong Pagar station. Plans for the line were confirmed and approved by the government on 12 June 1998. However, due to the high costs and lack of development in Marina South, the Chinatown branch was later removed in November 1999 and the line was reduced to 6 stations from the Dhoby Ghaut to Stadium stations. A part of the removed leg later became part of the Downtown line. On the other hand, a further extension towards Upper Paya Lebar was announced on 28 April 2001.

The Marina Line was eventually merged with a planned LRT line that goes from Paya Lebar to Buona Vista via Serangoon and Bishan to form Circle Line Stage 3 on 20 January 2003, and subsequently Circle Line Stage 4 and 5 on 12 December 2003 when Stage 4 was extended from Buona Vista to World Trade Centre to close up the link and to provide connectivity from the west to Sentosa, becoming the Circle Line. On 8 August 2001, SMRT won the bid and was appointed the operator of the Circle Line. Names for the stations for the first three stages of the Circle line were finalised in July 2005 after the Land Transport Authority (LTA) conducted a public consultation exercise on the naming of stations. In November 2005, the names of the stations in Stages 4 and 5 were finalised.

Construction of the initial stages

Construction started on 13 March 2002 for Stage 1, 5 September 2002 for Stage 2, May 2003 for Stage 3, and January 2005 for Stages 4 and 5. Initially planned to be opened in stages from 2006 to 2010, at an estimated cost of S$6.7 billion, the Nicoll Highway collapse delayed the opening of the first stage to 2009. When the line fully opened on 8 October 2011, the cost of construction had risen to nearly S$10 billion. Three stations on the Circle Line were initially designed as 'shell stations', but the decision was made to open two of them, Caldecott and Haw Par Villa (previously Thomson and West Coast respectively), leaving Bukit Brown as the only unopened station on the line.

The first section of the line, Stage 3, a  five-station segment stretching from Bartley to Marymount, opened on 28 May 2009. Initial ridership on this section was lower than estimated, at 32,000 passengers per day (ppd) instead of the estimated 55,000 ppd. Tunneling works for the entire line were completed on 17 August 2009. Stages 1 and 2 started operations on 17 April 2010, followed by Stages 4 and 5 (from the Marymount to HarbourFront stations) on 8 October 2011. A two-station extension to Marina Bay opened on 14 January 2012.

Circle Line Stage 6
On 17 January 2013, then-Minister for Transport Lui Tuck Yew announced 'Circle Line Stage 6' which will 'close the circle', set to be completed by 2025. The 4 km extension will run between Marina Bay and HarbourFront. The extension will connect commuters between the HarbourFront to Marina Bay stations and expand the rail network to the southern edge of the Central Business District. On 29 October 2015, LTA announced the station locations for Stage 6, with the working names of the stations being Keppel, Cantonment and Prince Edward. Tenders were called for construction between 2016 and 2017.

On 15 May 2017, the LTA invited the public to send in suggestions for names of the three MRT stations or propose to keep their current names. The Keppel and Cantonment stations kept their names, while Prince Edward station has been changed to 'Prince Edward Road' station.

Construction of Stage 6 commenced in late 2017. A joint venture – by China State Construction Engineering (The Singapore branch) and Nishimatsu Construction – won the contract to build the new Keppel MRT station and its associated tunnels.

Stage 6 of the line is now expected to be completed by 2026 instead due to delays caused by the COVID-19 pandemic. Tunnelling works for the CCL6 were completed on 12 January 2022, with a final tunnel breakthrough from Prince Edward Road station into Cantonment station. Prior to the tunnelling works, an extensive survey was conducted to ensure that the tunnels do not cross through the building's foundations. Structures were erected to protect the railway station's facade and interior, and monitoring instruments were installed to watch out for any building settlement. To construct the tunnels to Keppel station, the Keppel viaduct had to be closely monitored while underpinning the viaduct with new micro piles. Three bored piles were removed for the tunnelling works.

Incidents

Nicoll Highway collapse

On 20 April 2004, a section of the tunnel being built for the Circle Line collapsed, when a retaining wall used in the tunnel's construction gave way. This incident occurred near the proposed site of the Nicoll Highway station, not far from the Merdeka Bridge. Four workers were killed, and three were injured.

A criminal inquiry found the main contractor Nishimatsu Construction Company and joint venture partner firm Lum Chang Construction Company and their officers, as well as key Land Transport Authority officers responsible for the collapse. Several other officers and subcontractors were reprimanded and issued warnings in connection with the accident.

As a result of this accident, the first phase of the Circle Line, previously scheduled to open in 2008, was completed in 2009 instead.

This accident also resulted in stricter safety regulations for the construction of all future MRT lines. The shifting of the Nicoll Highway station also meant it can no longer serve as a terminus for the Bukit Timah Line, partially influencing the creation of the current Downtown Line.

Other incidents
On 16 August 2007, the Building and Construction Authority (BCA) issued a stop-work order and revoked the contractor's tunnelling permit after a  stretch of two lanes close to the junction of Telok Blangah Road and Alexandra Road sank about  that evening.

A section of the road above a construction site near Holland Road caved in on the morning of 24 May 2008, creating a hole. The hole, directly in front of two private houses along Cornwall Gardens, measured 8 by 7 metres and was 3 metres deep. No one was injured, but the road was temporarily closed to traffic.

Line disruptions
On 20 September 2011, a power fault disrupted train services at all 16 stations on the Circle Line. The four-hour delay left thousands of commuters stranded during rush-hour. It was reported that leaks and a damaged electrical cable along the Circle Line were the cause of the disruption. The disruption started at about 5.30 am. Train services were gradually restored from 8 am and all services were restored just before 10 am. Dakota and Mountbatten stations were the last two to resume operations. Investigations were carried out, and the fault was traced back to a faulty cable beneath the platform level at Dakota station. 27,000 passengers were affected by the disruption during the four hour delay, with bus bridging services plying the Circle Line route.

In late August 2016, intermittent signal interference led to a five-day series of train disruptions. The issue reappeared in November. A team of data scientists explored the data and discovered via a Marey Chart visualization that it was caused by hardware problems, sending errant signals from a "rogue" train, PV46.

Network and operations

Route

The  Circle line forms an incomplete loop from Dhoby Ghaut in the Central Region of Singapore, north to Serangoon and Bishan, and south to HarbourFront, with a branch from Promenade to Marina Bay station which will be extended to HarbourFront in 2026. The fully-underground circular route also makes several links with the other MRT lines. The line begins at Dhoby Ghaut station, which has an interchange with the North South and North East lines, going eastwards and paralleling Bras Basah Road and Raffles Boulevard, before joining the Circle line extension at Promenade station, which also interchanges with the Downtown line. From Promenade station, the line goes northwards and towards the east, passing beneath the Kallang Basin. Between the Stadium and Dakota stations, the line parallels Stadium Boulevard and Old Airport Road, then the line continues northwards and follows the route of Paya Lebar Road and Upper Paya Lebar Road between the Paya Lebar (which interchanges with the East West line) and Tai Seng stations.

The line curves and continues westwards between the Bartley and Marymount stations, also interchanging with the North East and North South lines at Serangoon and Bishan stations respectively, and then it continues in a general southwest direction between Caldecott and Kent Ridge, the former having an interchange with the Thomson East-Coast Line, passing through Bukit Brown Cemetery between the Caldecott and Botanic Gardens stations. The line also interchanges with the Downtown line at Botanic Gardens station and the East West line at Buona Vista station. After Kent Ridge station, the line curves eastwards, paralleling the West Coast Highway and then terminating at HarbourFront station, where it interchanges with the North East line.

From 2026, upon the completion of Stage 6, the Circle line will continue eastwards from Harbourfront, paralleling Keppel Road and Ayer Rajah Expressway, and joins the Circle line extension at Marina Bay station. The Circle line extension from Marina Bay to Promenade station generally parallels the Downtown line and Bayfront Avenue, also passing underneath Marina Bay Sands at Bayfront station, which it serves and has cross-platform interchange with the Downtown line.

Stations
Station codes for the line are orange, corresponding to the line's colour on the system map. All stations have island platforms, with the exception of Promenade and future infill station Bukit Brown. 

Legend

List

The Circle Line's numbering scheme reserves station code "CC18" for future use.

Depots

Rolling stock
The rolling stock for the Circle Line uses electric multiple unit (EMU) trains operating in a three-car configuration, with four doors per side on each carriage and can accommodate of up to 931 passengers in each trainsets. It consists of 40 first-generation Alstom Metropolis trains were supplied under contract C830. They are built in France by Alstom between 2006 and 2008. They are stabled at Kim Chuan Depot, which was the world's largest underground depot when it opened in 2009. To increase the capacity of the Circle Line, an additional 24 second-generation Alstom Metropolis trains were supplied under contract C830C, a similar in design to the first-generation trains, were delivered to Singapore from July 2014. They are also built in Shanghai, China by Alstom between 2014 and 2016. To facilitate the extension of the line with the construction of Stage 6, a tender for additional trains for the line was published on 31 March 2017. To increase the capacity of the Circle Line for Circle Line Stage 6, an additional 23 third-generation Alstom Metropolis trains were supplied under contract C851E with the first train set arrived in Singapore on 11 March 2022.

The automated CBTC system on board relies on "continuous two-way digital communication" between each controlled train and the control centre.

Train control
The Circle Line is equipped with Alstom Urbalis 300 Communications-based train control (CBTC) moving block signalling system on the MASTRIA system with Automatic train control (ATC) under Automatic train operation (ATO) GoA 4 (UTO). The subsystems consist of Automatic train protection (ATP) to govern train speed, Iconis Automatic Train Supervision (ATS) to track and schedule trains and Smartlock Computer-based interlocking (CBI) system that prevents incorrect signal and track points to be set.

Train Data Management System (TDMS) which concentrate and dispatch the rolling stock information with fixed equipment. The IAGO Waveguide communications network has the capability to transmit video and is almost maintenance-free. Base stations are located within the signalling equipment room.

Automatic platform screen doors supplied by Westinghouse provide safety for commuters, offering protection from arriving and departing trains.

In popular culture
The line is featured in HBO series Westworld, as part of the third season.

Notes and references

Notes

References

External links
 
 Circle line
 LTA's commemorative book detailing the construction of the Circle Line

Mass Rapid Transit (Singapore) lines
Railway lines opened in 2009
Railway loop lines
2009 establishments in Singapore